Isit (İhit) is a rural locality (a selo), the administrative centre of and one of two settlements, in addition to Nokhoroy, in Isitsky Rural Okrug of Khangalassky District in the Sakha Republic, Russia. Its population as of the 2002 Census was 374.

Climate

Isit has a subarctic climate (Köppen climate classification Dfc). Precipitation is quite low, but is significantly higher in summer than at other times of the year.

References

Notes

Sources
Official website of the Sakha Republic. Registry of the Administrative-Territorial Divisions of the Sakha Republic. Khangalassky District. 

Rural localities in Khangalassky District